Andaman district was a district of India, one of three districts in the Indian Union Territory (UT) of Andaman and Nicobar Islands. The district's administrative territory encompasses all of the Andaman Islands, which are located in the Indian Ocean (Bay of Bengal, bordering with the Andaman Sea). The district government is headed by a Deputy Commissioner, who in turn reports into the Lt. Governor of the Andaman and Nicobar Islands.

The capital of the district is the township of Port Blair, which is also the main town and capital of Andaman and Nicobar Islands UT. The district was severely affected by the tsunami that was caused by the 2004 Indian Ocean earthquake, which led to many deaths and damaged infrastructure.

Geography
There are approximately 550 islands which made up the Andaman district, 26 of which are inhabited. The total population of Andaman district as per 2001 Census of India figures was 314,084. The district had a total area of some 6,408 km2. Approximately 90% of the islands are forested or uncultivated; urban area is only 16.6 km2.

Divisions
The district comprised two sub-divisions, North & Middle Andaman (Mayabunder), and South & Little Andaman (Port Blair), which were turned into districts by splitting the Andaman district on August 18, 2006.

Former districts of India